Smet is a Dutch occupational surname. Smet is a regional form of Smid ("Smith") and is equivalent to the more abundant surname Smit. It is common in East Flanders. People named Smet include:

David Smet (born 1966), French singer/songwriter and amateur sports car racer
Eugenia Smet (1825–1871), French founder of the Society of Helpers of the Holy Souls
Henrich Smet (1535/7-1614), Flemish court physician and humanist
Kathleen Smet (born 1970), Belgian triathlete
Jean-Philippe Smet (1943-2017), French singer and actor, father of David and Laura
Laura Smet (born 1983), French actress
Marc Smet (born 1951), Belgian long-distance runner
Miet Smet (born 1943), Belgian politician
Mike Smet (born 1991), Belgian footballer
Pascal Smet (born 1967), Belgian politician, Flemish government minister
Tony Smet (born 1870), Belgian fencer

See also
Smets, surname
De Smet (surname)
De Smet (disambiguation)

References

Dutch-language surnames
Surnames of Belgian origin